Cyclestheria is a genus of shrimps belonging to the family Cyclestheriidae.

The species of this genus are found in Southern Hemisphere.

Species:
 Cyclestheria hislopi (Baird, 1859)

References

Branchiopoda